The 1941–42 Svenska Serien season was the seventh season of the Svenska Serien, the top level ice hockey league in Sweden. Hammarby IF won the league for the fourth straight year.

Final standings

External links
1941-42 season

Svenska Serien (ice hockey) seasons
1941–42 in Swedish ice hockey leagues